David G. Bewley (22 September 1920 – 6 March 2013) was an English professional footballer who played as a full back for several teams in the Football League. He was born in Bournemouth, England. He died on 6 March 2013. At his death, he was Reading's oldest former player.

References

1920 births
2013 deaths
Footballers from Bournemouth
English footballers
Ebbsfleet United F.C. players
Fulham F.C. players
Reading F.C. players
Watford F.C. players
English Football League players
Aldershot F.C. wartime guest players
Southampton F.C. wartime guest players
Fulham F.C. non-playing staff
Association football fullbacks